The Washington Nationals, sometimes referred to as the Washington Statesmen or Senators, were a professional baseball team in the mid to late 1880s. During their four-year tenure they had six different managers and compiled a record of 163–337, for a .326 winning percentage. The franchise played their home games at Swampoodle Grounds, otherwise known as Capitol Park (II).

Their most notable player was catcher Connie Mack, who went on to a Hall of Fame career as manager of the American League Philadelphia Athletics from 1901 to 1950. Outfielder Dummy Hoy, notable for being deaf, played for the 1888 and 1889 Washington teams. Jim Donnelly also spent time with the Nationals.

Baseball Hall of Famers

See also
1886 Washington Nationals season
1887 Washington Nationals season
1888 Washington Nationals season
1889 Washington Nationals season
Washington Nationals (1886–1889) all-time roster

References
Baseball Reference.com

See also
Washington Nationals (disambiguation)
Washington Senators (disambiguation)
Washington Nationals current MLB team

 
Defunct Major League Baseball teams
Baseball teams in Washington, D.C.
Baseball teams established in 1886
Baseball teams disestablished in 1889
1886 establishments in Washington, D.C.
1889 disestablishments in Washington, D.C.
Defunct baseball teams in Washington, D.C.
Baseball teams disestablished in 1951